Fernando Viana Jardim Silva (born February 20 1992), known as Fernando Viana, is a Brazilian footballer who plays as a forward for Santo André.

Career

Botev Plovdiv

2016-17

Fernando Viana joined Botev Plovdiv in January 2017. He made an impressive official debut on 18 February by securing the 0-1 away win over Lokomotiv Gorna Oryahovitsa.  On 6 March he scored twice for the 2-0 home win in the derby game with Beroe Stara Zagora.

2017-18
On 20 July Fernando Viana scored a goal during the 4-0 win over Beitar Jerusalem in the 2nd qualifying round of UEFA Europa League. A few days later, on 23 July, Viana scored twice for 2-3 away win over Slavia Sofia. On 25 August Viana scored for the 1-1 draw against Etar Veliko Turnovo.
On 12 October 2017 Fernando Viana scored 4 goals during the 5-0 home victory over FC Septemvri and became the first ever foreigner with such achievement in an official match for Botev Plovdiv.

Guarani FC
In the beginning of January 2019, Viana joined Guarani FC.

Return to Botev
Viana rejoined Botev Plovdiv in August 2019 on a contract for 4 months with the option for an 18-month extension. He left the team in January 2020.

Career statistics

Honours
Botev Plovdiv
Bulgarian Cup: 2016–17
Bulgarian Supercup: 2017

References

External links

1992 births
Footballers from Brasília
Living people
Brazilian footballers
Association football forwards

Joinville Esporte Clube players
Paraná Clube players
Ituano FC players
Botev Plovdiv players
Al Dhafra FC players
Suwon FC players
Guarani FC players
Kisvárda FC players
Újpest FC players
Criciúma Esporte Clube players
Esporte Clube Santo André players
Campeonato Brasileiro Série B players
Campeonato Catarinense players
Campeonato Brasileiro Série A players
First Professional Football League (Bulgaria) players
UAE Pro League players
K League 2 players
Nemzeti Bajnokság I players
Brazilian expatriate footballers
Expatriate footballers in Bulgaria
Brazilian expatriate sportspeople in Bulgaria
Expatriate footballers in the United Arab Emirates
Brazilian expatriate sportspeople in the United Arab Emirates
Expatriate footballers in South Korea
Brazilian expatriate sportspeople in South Korea
Expatriate footballers in Hungary
Brazilian expatriate sportspeople in Hungary